Apostibes griseolineata is a moth of the family Scythrididae. It was described by Lord Walsingham in 1907. It is found in Israel, Kazakhstan, Uzbekistan, Saudi Arabia, Palestine, Libya, Algeria and Tunisia.

References

Scythrididae
Moths described in 1907